Albert Downing Gray (born 1938) is an American amateur golfer. 

Gray played college golf at Florida State University, where he once won seven straight tournaments. He played in the Masters Tournament seven times, twice finishing as low amateur. He had a long relationship with the United States Walker Cup team, appearing three times as a player (1963, 1965, and 1967) and twice as a captain (1995 and 1997).

He played in the U.S. Amateur 19 times, finishing as runner-up in 1962.

Gray is a member of the FSU Hall of Fame, the Southern Golf Association Hall of Fame, and the Florida State Golf Association Hall of Fame.

Results in major championships

Note: The only major Gray played was the Masters.

LA = Low amateur
CUT = missed the half-way cut
"T" = tied

U.S. national team appearances
Amateur
Walker Cup: 1963 (winners), 1965 (tied, cup retained), 1967 (winners), 1995 (non-playing captain), 1997 (non-playing captain, winners)
Eisenhower Trophy: 1966
Americas Cup: 1965, 1967 (winners)

References

American male golfers
Amateur golfers
Florida State Seminoles men's golfers
1938 births
Living people